Yusefabad (also Romanized as Yūsefābād) is a village in Ahlamerestaq-e Shomali Rural District, in the Central District of Mahmudabad County, Mazandaran Province, Iran. At the 2006 census, its population was 637, in 156 families.

References 

Populated places in Mahmudabad County